David Reid may refer to:

Sport 
David Reid (footballer, born 1897) (1897–1963), Scottish footballer
David Reid (Hibernian footballer), Scottish footballer
David Reid (boxer) (born 1973), American boxer
David Reid (curler) (born 1987), Scottish curler

Politics 
David Settle Reid (1813–1891), American governor of North Carolina
Sir David Reid, 1st Baronet (1872–1939), British Member of Parliament for East Down and Down
David Reid (politician) (1933–2017), former member of the Western Australian Legislative Assembly
David Reid (pastoralist) (1820–1906), pastoralist and former member of the Victorian Legislative Assembly

David A. Reid (born 1962), American politician in Virginia

Others
David Boswell Reid (1805–1863), Scottish physician, chemist and inventor
David Reid (businessman) (born 1947), chairman of Kwik Fit, former chairman of Tesco
David Reid, British musician and founding member of The Contrast
Lance (DC Comics), whose alter-ego is named David Reid

See also
SS David C. Reid, an American molasses tanker that sank in 1928
Dave Reid (disambiguation)
David Reed (disambiguation)
David Read (disambiguation)